Pilotti is an Italian surname. Notable people with the surname include:

Eva-Lena Pilotti (born 1961), Swedish model
Massimo Pilotti (1879–1962), Italian jurist and judge

See also
Elisabetta Pilotti-Schiavonetti (c. 1680 – 1742), Italian opera singer

Italian-language surnames